Zamani is a word with multiple uses across both Asia and Africa. It is often related to time and the past.

Places
Zamani, South African township near Memel, Free State

Iran
Zahmani, small village in Horr Rural District in western Iran
Zamani Mahalleh, small village in Asalem Rural District in north-western Iran
Zamani, Iran, small village in Sedeh Rural District in eastern Iran
Qaleh-ye Juq Zamani, village in Boghrati Rural District in western Iran
Khan Jamal-e Zamani, village in  Bavaleh Rural District in western Iran
Hemmatabad-e Zamani, town in Takht-e Jolgeh Rural District in eastern Iran
Aghcheh Kohal-e Zamani, small village in Ujan-e Sharqi Rural District in western Iran
Chapar Pord-e Zaman, village in northern Iran
Rudbar-e Mohammad-e Zamani Rural District, district in Qazvin Province

People
Zamani Lekwot (born 1944), former Military Governor of Rivers State, Nigeria
Asifa Zamani, Indian scholar in Persian language
Mahla Zamani, Iranian fashion designer and journalist
Alireza Zamani (born 1994), Iranian arachnologist
Malika-uz-Zamani (1703–1789), Empress of the Mughal Empire
Mariam-uz-Zamani (1542–1623), Empress of the Mughal Empire
Mahdi Zamani (born 1992), Scientific image specialist, science communicator & photographer
Mehdi Zamani (born 1989), Iranian sprint athlete
Mohammad Hashem Zamani (1928–2005), Afghan poet
Mohammad-Reza Ali-Zamani (?–2010), executed Iranian political activist
Mohd Norhafiz Zamani Misbah (born 1981), Malaysian soccer player
Mosleh Zamani (1980s–2009), executed Iranian minor
Mostafa Zamani (born 1982), Iranian actor
Panshak Zamani (born 1986), Nigerian hiphop artist known as Ice Prince
Roia Zamani, Afghan female taekwondo practitioner
Saman Aghazamani (born 1989), Iranian soccer player
Zamani Ibrahim (born 1971), Malaysian Singer

Others
Av Zamanı, 1988 Turkish drama film known in English as Hunting Time
Sasha and Zamani, African time concept
Shuwa-Zamani language, a Kainji language of Nigeria
Zamani Project, African cultural heritage database

See also
Zaman (disambiguation)
Zamania, city in Uttar Pradesh, India
Zamanil, alternative name for Oxyphencyclimine